David James Myers (born 8 September 1957) is an English television presenter, best known as one half of the Hairy Bikers, along with Si King. He is also known for his appearances on the BBC celebrity talent show Strictly Come Dancing. Together, Myers and King have presented a number of television cookery series for the BBC. They have also launched their own product called The Hairy Bikers Diet Club.

Early life
Myers was born in Barrow-in-Furness where his father worked as a foreman in a paper mill. He attended Barrow-in-Furness Grammar School for Boys where he had an inspirational art teacher, Mr Eaton. He went on to earn a fine art degree at Goldsmiths, University of London and a master's degree in art history. The first bike Myers bought was a Cossack Ural Mars Mk III, with a sidecar, when he was a student.

Myers then became a professional make-up artist, specialising in prosthetics. He met Si King in 1995 on the set of a TV drama titled The Gambling Man.

Career

Hairy Bikers

The duo first appeared on the BBC's show The Hairy Bikers' Cookbook. The programme presented a mixture of cookery and travelogue, using a similar style to chef Keith Floyd, including the habit of frequently referring to the cameraman and other crew. Most shows featured the pair riding motorbikes, including the BMW R1200GS, F650GS and Triumph Rocket III. The show also featured elements of the Two Fat Ladies format, including regular banter between the two stars, use of various unusual cooking locations and the use of motorbikes.

On 24 August 2009, they hosted a 30-part daytime series for BBC Two, The Hairy Bikers' Food Tour of Britain, which aired weekdays. The series saw them visit a different county each day and cook what they considered to be that county's signature dish.

In January 2010, a six-part series titled The Hairy Bikers: Mums Know Best was broadcast on BBC Two.

On 25 October 2010 a new 40-episode series, The Hairy Bikers' Cook Off, was launched on BBC Two. The programme included a cook off between two families and celebrity guests.

From January to May 2010, the Hairy Bikers performed their Big Night Out show in theatres throughout the UK. Directed by Bob Mortimer, the show was a fun mixture of cooking and chat plus a little song and dance. It explored their youth, how they met and their love of food.

In June 2011, the Bikers appeared in the second series of Mum Knows Best. The series, made up of eight episodes, featured three 'Star Mums' whose recipes were tested and shared with the public.

October 2011 saw a new series, Meals on Wheels, air on BBC Two. The series fronted a campaign with BBC Learning to save local 'meals on wheels' services around the UK.

From November to December 2011, the Bikers appeared in a 30-part BBC series called Hairy Bikers: Best of British, airing at 3:45pm on BBC Two (apart from the show's final week, in which it aired on BBC One). The series celebrated British recipes and championed local produce. In January 2012, continuing into February, BBC Two showed hour-long re-versions including recipes from various episodes of the series.

After they had signed new contracts with the BBC in 2011, a new series was commissioned. The Hairy Biker's Bakeation saw the Hairy Bikers doing what they love best – a gastronomic road trip, uncovering the best baking on offer across Europe, from Norway, the Low Countries (Netherlands, Belgium and Luxembourg), Germany, Eastern Europe (Slovakia, Hungary and Romania), Austria, Italy and France to Spain.

In March 2012, Good Food commissioned The Hairy Biker's Mississippi Adventure, the duo's first series for the channel. UKTV gave a description of the series: "In this ultimate food and music pilgrimage, the perennially popular Hairy Bikers are getting back in the saddle as they explore the length of the iconic Mississippi River in America in pursuit of the delicious roots of soul food and Southern music." The series was produced by Mentorn Media, and the Bikers' first interactive iOS app, also produced by Mentorn, was released to accompany the series.

In August 2012, Hairy Dieters: How to Love Food and Lose Weight showed how The Hairy Bikers radically changed lifestyles, but stayed true to their love of great food, as they embarked on a campaign to lose two and a half stone in three months, and comfortably passed their target weights.

In February 2014, they launched a new series, The Hairy Bikers' Asian Adventure for BBC Two which saw them travelling in Asia sampling the local cuisine, meeting local people and cooking up some native dishes themselves. The series follows in a similar style to the Bakeation series in 2012.

In March 2015, they co-presented The Nation's Favourite Food on BBC Two alongside Lorraine Pascale.

After having experienced their own success with balancing eating the food they love while also being conscious of their health and losing weight, they wanted to help others to do the same. In January 2014, they launched The Hairy Bikers Diet Club, which includes recipes and tips and tricks to help people to live a healthier and trimmer life, while not starving to be "skinny minnies".

In September 2017, along with his Hairy Bikers partner Si King Myers was initiated into the showbusiness charity the Grand Order of Water Rats.

Health 
In May 2022 Myers revealed that he had been diagnosed with cancer and had been undergoing chemotherapy treatment.  In January 2023 he appeared on the BBC Breakfast show, announcing a new series of The Hairy Bikers tv show, and gave an update on his continuing treatment.

Theatre
2014: Cinderella (Pantomime) Hexagon Theatre, Reading, support role, season 2014-15

Filmography
Guest appearances
Richard & Judy – Guest
The Weakest Link: Celebrity Special – Contestant
Hole in the Wall (20 September 2008) – Contestant
Genius (October 2010) – Guest
This Morning (30 July 2012) – Guest chef
Countdown (August 2012, January 2013, October 2014) – Guest in Dictionary Corner
Sunday Brunch (16 September 2012) – Guest
Loose Women (22 March 2013, 22 October 2013, 13 February 2014, 17 October 2014) – Guest
Would I Lie To You? (28 June 2013) – Panellist
Never Mind the Buzzcocks (23 September 2013) – Panellist
Lorraine (12 November 2013) – Guest
Daybreak (15 January 2014) – Guest
Room 101 (7 February 2014) – Guest
All About Two (20 April 2014) – Guest panellist
Through the Keyhole (11 October 2014) – Celebrity homeowner
Holiday of My Lifetime (20 October 2014) – Guest
The Great British Children in Need Sewing Bee (21 October 2014) – Contestant
Celebrity Juice (24 October 2014) – Panellist
All Star Family Fortunes (25 January 2015) – Contestant
A Cook Abroad (2 February 2015) – Guest presenter
The Chase: Celebrity Special (2015) – Contestant

Strictly Come Dancing
In 2013, Myers participated in Strictly Come Dancing (series 11), partnered with professional ballroom dancer Karen Hauer. They were voted out on 10 November.

Personal life
In 1998 Myers lost his fiancee to cancer and then at the end of the year he suffered lots of migraines and memory loss. Doctors scanned him and he was told that he had a shadow on his brain, which turned out to be a benign arachnoid cyst, and emergency surgery successfully drained it.

In 2011 Myers married his girlfriend Liliana Orzac whom he met while filming Hairy Bikers in Romania for the BBC. He has two stepchildren from Orzac's previous relationship. In 2015, Myers co-wrote an autobiography with Si King, entitled The Hairy Bikers: Blood, Sweat and Tyres.

In 2018 Myers was informed that he was suffering from glaucoma. In October 2021 fellow Hairy Biker Si King announced that Myers was recovering after contracting COVID-19.

In May 2022, Myers announced he had been diagnosed with cancer and was undergoing chemotherapy treatment.

References

External links
Hairy Bikers official website

1957 births
Living people                                          
Alumni of Goldsmiths, University of London
People educated at Barrow-in-Furness Grammar School for Boys
People from Barrow-in-Furness
English people of Danish descent
English chefs
English television chefs
English autobiographers